Antriol (also Entrejol) is a neighbourhood of Kralendijk on the island of Bonaire in the Netherlands Antilles. It used to be a separate village which has merged into Kralendijk.

History
Antriol was founded in 1626 by Spanish and Portuguese citizens who had been deported from Aruba and Curaçao to Bonaire. It was originally named Al Interior (the interior) which was corrupted to Antriol or Entrejol. The people of Antriol were mainly employed in the salt mines and lived in self-made houses. It wasn't until the 1930s, that concrete buildings started to be built.

Our Lady of Coromoto Church is located in Antriol.

References

Kralendijk
Populated places in Bonaire